Xavier College, is a private Catholic primary and secondary school, located in Santiago de Compostela, Galicia, Spain. The school was established by the Society of Jesus in 1961, and is situated in the center of the historic pilgrimage town of northwestern Spain.

See also

 Catholic Church in Spain
 Education in Spain
 List of Jesuit schools

References  

Jesuit secondary schools in Spain
Buildings and structures in Santiago de Compostela
1961 establishments in Spain
Educational institutions established in 1961
Schools in Galicia